Alán Alejandro Maldonado Tamez (September 24, 1984) is a Mexican rapper better known by his stage name Dharius (previously MC Dharius). He is known for having formed part of the Hip Hop Cartel de Santa group from 1999 to 2013. The video and song "Me Alegro de Su Odio" was the last composition he made with Cartel de Santa.

Discography 
 2002 Cartel de Santa 
 2004 Vol. II
 2006 Volumen ProIIIbido
 2008 Vol. IV
 2010 Síncopa
 2012 Me Atizo Macizo Tour 2012 En Vivo Desde el D.F
 2014 Directo Hasta Arriba
 2018 Mala Fama, Buena Vidha
 2022 Cuando Todo Acaba

References 

Mexican male rappers
People from Monterrey
People from Nuevo León
1984 births
Living people